Polymerisation inhibitors (US: polymerization inhibitors) are chemical compounds added to monomers to prevent their auto-polymerisation. Unsaturated monomers such as acrylates, vinyl chloride, butadiene and styrene require inhibitors for both processing and safe transport and storage. Many monomers are purified industrially by distillation, which can lead to thermally initiated polymerisation. Styrene for example is distilled at temperatures above 100 °C whereupon it undergoes thermal polymerisation at a rate of ~2% per hour. This polymerisation is undesirable, as it can foul the fractionating tower, it is also typically exothermic which can lead to a runaway reaction and potential explosion if left unchecked. Once initiated polymerisation is typically radical in mechanism and as such many polymerisation inhibitors act as radical scavengers.

Inhibitors vs retarders
The term 'inhibitor' is often used in a general sense to describe any compound used to prevent unwanted polymerisation, however these compounds are often divided into 'retarders' and 'true inhibitors'. A true inhibitor has a well defined induction period during which no noticeable polymerisation takes place. They are consumed during this period and once gone polymerisation occurs as normal. Retarders display no induction period but provide a permanent decrease in the rate of polymerisation, while themselves being degraded only slowly. Attempts have been made to define the difference quantitatively in terms of reaction rate. In an industrial setting compounds from both classes will usually be used together, with the true inhibitor providing optimal plant performance and the retarder acting as a failsafe.

Inhibitors for processing

True inhibitors
Radical polymerisation of unsaturated monomers is generally propagated by C-radicals. These can be effectively terminated by combining with other radicals to form neutral species and many true inhibitors operate through this mechanism. In the simplest example oxygen can be used as it exists naturally in its triplet state (i.e. it is a diradical). This is referred to as air inhibition and is a diffusion-controlled reaction with rates typically in the order of 107–109 mol−1 s−1, the resulting peroxy radicals (ROO•) are less reactive towards polymerisation. However air stabilisation is not suitable for monomers with which it can form explosive peroxides, such as vinyl chloride. Other stable radicals include TEMPO and TEMPOL, which are exceedingly effective radical scavengers. Certain compounds marketed as true inhibitors, such as p-phenylenediamines, phenothiazine and hydroxylamines like HPHA and DEHA, are also thought to react through the intermediary of aminoxyl radicals. Not all inhibitors are radicals however, with quinones and quinone methides being important examples.

Retarders
Certain hydroxylamines and p-phenylenediamines, may act as retarders. For styrene, nitrophenol compounds such as dinitro-ortho-cresol and di-nitro-sec-butylphenol (DNBP) have long been the important, however they are coming under regulatory pressure due to their high toxicity.

Inhibitors for transport & storage
Purified monomers stored at ambient temperatures are of less risk of polymerising and as such the most highly reactive inhibitors are rarely used at this stage. In general compounds are chosen which can be easily removed immediately prior to industrial polymerisation to make plastics. Compounds bearing a hydroxy group, which can be removed by an alkali wash, tend to dominate. Examples include 4-tert-butylcatechol (TBC), 4-methoxyphenol (MEHQ), butylated hydroxytoluene (BHT) and hydroquinone (HQ).

See also
Anti-skinning agent - These agents prevent polymerisation in paints and varnishes by binding to, and thus inhibiting, the action of oil drying agents
Tubulin polymerisation inhibitors - chemotherapy drugs that interfere with the tubulin system

References

Monomers